Nedim Durić (born 24 July 1993 in Cazin) is a Bosnian-Herzegovinian footballer currently playing for Austrian 4th tier side Union Edelweiss Linz. He plays as a left midfielder.

Club career 
Durić started out playing for FK Krajina Cazin's U19 team before he was transferred into the senior team where he played for seven months until he was taken into the Slovenian team FC Luka Koper's U19 team. There he would spend an entire year polishing his skills before being transferred to another Slovenian team, namely ND Gorica. It was there that he made his debut in the Slovenian PrvaLiga as a substitute, during a match between his new team and ND Mura 05, on 24 November 2012.
During the summer of 2013 he transferred to the Bosnian-Herzegovinian team FK Olimpic Sarajevo.

References 

1993 births
Living people
People from Cazin
Association football midfielders
Bosnia and Herzegovina footballers
ND Gorica players
FK Olimpik players
NK Jedinstvo Bihać players
Slovenian PrvaLiga players
Premier League of Bosnia and Herzegovina players
First League of the Federation of Bosnia and Herzegovina players
Austrian Landesliga players
Bosnia and Herzegovina expatriate footballers
Expatriate footballers in Slovenia
Bosnia and Herzegovina expatriate sportspeople in Slovenia
Expatriate footballers in Austria
Bosnia and Herzegovina expatriate sportspeople in Austria